Caringi is a noble surname of Italian origin. Notable people with the surname include:

Pete Caringi Jr. (born 1955), American soccer coach
Pete Caringi III (born 1992), American soccer player
Tania Marie Caringi (born 1986), Italian-American model

Italian-language surnames